Carolyn Arthur "Biddy" Martin (born 1951) is an American academic, author, and a former president of Amherst College, in Amherst, Massachusetts.

Before becoming president at Amherst, she was Chancellor of the University of Wisconsin–Madison, where she assumed office on September 1, 2008, succeeding John D. Wiley. She was the ninth graduate of UW–Madison to serve as its chancellor, and the first alumna to hold that position. She was the university's second female chancellor, after Donna Shalala, and also the university's first openly lesbian chancellor.

Martin is married to historian Gabriele Strauch.

Before becoming chancellor at the University of Wisconsin–Madison, she was Provost of Cornell University in Ithaca, New York from July 1, 2000 until August 31, 2008. As provost, Martin served as chief academic officer and chief operating officer, providing leadership for deans of Cornell’s 14 colleges and schools, as well as a number of centers and faculty advisory councils. She helped manage the institution’s academic programs, executive budgets, capital budgets and operating plans. Martin worked on Cornell's academic faculty for 15 years prior to her appointment as provost.

Early life and education
Martin grew up in Timberlake, Virginia, just outside Lynchburg. The women in her family shared the name Carolyn, earning nicknames "Buck" (grandmother), "Boolie" (mother), and "Biddy" for Martin. She graduated from Brookville High School in 1969, where she was valedictorian and set the school scoring record for girls' basketball. She received her undergraduate degree from the College of William and Mary in 1973, where she was a member of Phi Beta Kappa. She earned an M.A. in German Literature from Middlebury College’s program in Mainz, Germany and received her Ph.D. in German Literature in 1985 from the University of Wisconsin–Madison.

Career 
Martin joined the faculty at Cornell in 1985.

In 1991, she was promoted to associate professor in the Department of German Studies with a joint appointment in the Women’s Studies Program. She served as chair of the Department of German Studies from 1994 to 1997, and in 1997 was promoted to full Professor.  In 1996, she was appointed Senior Associate Dean in the College of Arts and Sciences, a position she held until 2000. Between 2000 and 2008, she assumed the role as Cornell's Provost. She served as Chancellor of UW-Madison from 2008 to 2011. In 2018, she was elected a Fellow of the Harvard Corporation, which oversees Harvard College.

Martin is the author of numerous articles and two books—one on a literary and cultural figure in the Freud circle, Lou Andreas-Salomé, and the other on gender theory.

In 2012, during Martin's tenure as president of Amherst College, twenty-year-old student Trey Malone committed suicide, reportedly as a result of the school's mishandling of his sexual assault by another student. Malone's suicide note, which was published by The Good Men Project, alleged that President Martin's first question to the student upon meeting him to discuss the assault was: "Have you handled your drinking problem?"  The purported mishandling of Malone's case and his subsequent suicide raised the question within the media of victim blaming by college administrators around the country.

On September 13th, 2021, Martin announced that she would be leaving Amherst College.

Major initiatives

Cornell (2000–2008)
During her tenure as provost, Martin led a faculty salary-improvement program, oversaw Cornell's interdisciplinary Life Sciences Initiative, authorized a National Science Foundation ADVANCE grant proposal to enhance recruitment and retention of women in science and engineering and established and developed a budget for Cornell's Center for a Sustainable Future.

Financial Aid Initiative
In 2008, Martin announced a financial aid initiative aimed at eliminating need-based loans for all undergraduate students from families with incomes under $75,000. The purpose of the initiative was to make it possible for new students to graduate debt-free.

New Student Reading Project
Martin started a reading project for incoming students, recruiting more than 200 faculty volunteers to lead small-group discussions with new students. The project has become a collaborative activity with the city of Ithaca.

Joan and Sanford Weill Life Sciences Building
Martin oversaw the $150 million creation of the Joan and Sanford Weill Life Sciences Building, a  building that serves as the university's hub for life sciences and interdisciplinary collaborations. It is home to the Weill Institute for Cell and Molecular Biology and the Department of Biomedical Engineering.

University of Wisconsin–Madison (2008–2011)
As chancellor, Martin led successful initiatives to increase need-based financial aid, improve undergraduate education, and enhance research administration. The Madison Initiative for Undergraduates promoted student advising, innovations in undergraduate programs, and faculty diversity. Martin also spearheaded an effort to gain greater operating flexibility and increased autonomy for Wisconsin’s flagship campus. Martin advocated for diversity during her tenure. At the 2008 Diversity Forum, she closed the event stating, "We are a plural people whose joint efforts are required to address the world's problems. ... Interactions are key to realizing our full potential as human beings and groups."

Madison Initiative for Undergraduates
Martin's first major policy initiative as Chancellor was the implementation of an incremental four-year tuition increase plan called the Madison Initiative for Undergraduates. This plan pays for more undergraduate course offerings, additional faculty and staff to teach those courses, enhanced student services, and supplemental (and eventually complete) financial assistance for students whose families make under $80,000 a year. The plan was approved by the Board of Regents on May 8, 2009.

Go Big Read!
Martin has also created the university's first Common Read program, known as Go Big Read!, which began in Fall 2009. The inaugural selected title was In Defense of Food: An Eater's Manifesto, by Michael Pollan. For Fall 2010, the announced selection was The Immortal Life of Henrietta Lacks by Rebecca Skloot.

New Badger Partnership
In 2010, Martin initiated a series of public fora concerning what she described as a "new business model for UW–Madison". This proposal, called the "New Badger Partnership", was purportedly intended to safeguard the university finance and help mend the state's fiscal gaps. As part of this proposal, Martin called for "greater flexibility for the university, combined with reasonable forms of accountability and more effective operations" which "can strengthen the university's position and its ability to serve the state." Among its early stated aims were the ability to set market-based tuition, provide more financial aid and compensate faculty separately from pay plans for other state agencies. The most radical feature of this plan involved the separation of UW-Madison from the University of Wisconsin System, and redesignating it as a public authority governed by an independent Board of Trustees. The plan, however, proved polarizing, and Martin left for Amherst the following year.

Publications

Books
 Woman and Modernity: The (Life)Styles of Lou Andreas-Salomé, Cornell University Press, 1991.
 Femininity Played Straight: The Significance of Being Lesbian, Routledge Press, 1996.

Other
 "Sex Change vs. Social Change", Review of The Transsexual Empire, by Janice G. Raymond, Bread & Roses, vol. 2, no. 3, 1980, pp. 41–41.
 "Feminism, Criticism, and Foucault", New German Critique, vol. 27, Autumn, 1982, pp. 3–30.
 "A Study in Contrasts", Review of Gynesis: Configurations of Women and Modernity, by Alice Jardine, The Woman's Review of Books, vol. 4, no. 1., Oct., 1986, p. 22.
 "Lesbian Identity and Autobiographical Difference[s]", Life/Lines: Theorizing Women’s Autobiography, edited by Bella Brodzki and Celeste Schenck, Cornell University Press, 1988, pp. 77–104.
 "The Hobo, the Fairy, and the Quarterback", Profession, 1994, pp. 15–20.
 "Sexualities without Genders and Other Queer Utopias", Diacritics, vol. 24, no. 2/3, Critical Crossings (Summer–Autumn, 1994), pp. 104–121.
 "Teaching Literature, Changing Cultures”, PMLA, vol. 112, no. 1, Special Topic: The Teaching of Literature (Jan., 1997), pp. 7–25.
 "Success and Its Failures", Feminist Consequences: Theory for the New Century, edited by Elisabeth Bronfen and Misha Kavka, Columbia University Press, 2001, pp. 353–380
 Mohanty, Chandra Talpade. “What’s Home Got to Do with It? (With Biddy Martin)”, Feminism without Borders: Decolonizing Theory, Practicing Solidarity, Duke University Press, 2003, pp. 85–105
 "The Work of Love", New German Critique, no. 95, Special Issue for David Bathrick (Spring - Summer, 2005), pp. 27–36.

References

External links
 University of Wisconsin–Madison Chancellor's Office
 UWisconsin press release 
 Carolyn Martin vitae

American humanities academics
College of William & Mary alumni
Cornell University faculty
Leaders of the University of Wisconsin-Madison
University of Wisconsin–Madison College of Letters and Science alumni
Middlebury College alumni
1951 births
Living people
Fellows of the American Academy of Arts and Sciences
People from Campbell County, Virginia
Women heads of universities and colleges
Lesbian academics
Presidents of Amherst College
LGBT people from Virginia